Piñero station is a railway station in San Juan, Puerto Rico located in the Hato Rey Sur district. The station is named after the Jesús T. Piñero Avenue where it is located. The station opened on December 17, 2004. It features a work of public art entitled Viandante by the artist Marnie Pérez Moliere.

Nearby
 Centro Judicial de San Juan
 Hospital Español Auxilio Mutuo
 El Monte Mall
 Condominio El Monte

Bus terminal 

D26: TU Piñero–Río Piedras–Venus Gardens
E40: TU Piñero–The Mall of San Juan–Luis Muñoz Marín International Airport (SJU)
T8: TU Piñero–Ave. Jesús T. Piñero–TU Martínez Nadal
T41: TU Piñero– Ave. Barbosa-Cal. De Diego–The Mall of San Juan–Iturregui

See also 
 List of Tren Urbano stations

References

External links 

Tren Urbano stations
Railway stations in the United States opened in 2004
2004 establishments in Puerto Rico